Isabel Bateman (December 28, 1854 – 1934)  was an American actress. She was born near Cincinnati, Ohio on December 28, 1854. The daughter of the actors H. L. Bateman and Sidney Frances Bateman. Her sisters were the actors Kate Josephine Bateman and Virginia Frances Bateman.

Her family relocated to England in 1863. She first played a juvenile part in 1865 in her sister, Kate’s, farewell benefit at Her Majesty's Theatre. She began active theatrical work in 1869. She took leading parts with Henry Irving for six years. She was very successful in many leading roles.

She left the theatre in 1898 and entered the Anglican Community of St Mary the Virgin in Wantage, eventually becoming Mother Superior of the Order.

Gallery

References

Attribution

External links
 

1854 births
1934 deaths
19th-century American actresses
American stage actresses
People from Cincinnati
Anglican nuns
Wikipedia articles incorporating text from A Woman of the Century